Apaye (English: A Mother's Love) is a 2014 Nigerian biographical drama film directed by Desmond Elliot and starring Clarion Chukwura, Kanayo O. Kanayo, Belinda Effah, and Mbong Amata. It premièred at the Silverbird Cinemas, Victoria Island, Lagos on 7, March 2014. The comic role Yepayeye, tells the story of the life and struggles of Elder Irene Yepayeye Uriah-Dieah, who was a relative of Goodluck Jonathan in real life.

It tells a story about how Yepayeye (Clarion Chukwura) struggles to overcome the many challenges of a single mother of 6 and eventually triumphed in ensuring the uprightness and education of her kids.

Cast

Kanayo O. Kanayo as Emman
Clarion Chukwura as Yepayeye
Belinda Effah as Young Yepayeye
Mbong Amata as Suam
Caro Michael as Small Yepayeye

Reception
Nollywood Reinvented gave it a 53% ratings then praised the storyline, directing and music. It concluded by stating that despite her low expectations from movies generally, Apaye succeeded in being a "pleasant surprise...".

References

2014 films
2014 biographical drama films
English-language Nigerian films
2014 drama films
2010s English-language films